North Carolina Wesleyan University (NCWU) is a private Methodist university in Rocky Mount, North Carolina. It was founded in 1956. North Carolina Wesleyan also offers evening courses at its main Rocky Mount campus, as well as satellite locations in Brunswick, Durham, Goldsboro, Greenville, Manteo, New Bern, Raleigh, Washington, Wilmington and Winston-Salem.

History 

On May 14, 1956, the North Carolina Annual Conference of The United Methodist Church met in Goldsboro and approved a petition from the citizens of the city of Rocky Mount to locate a college in their community. The college was officially chartered by the State of North Carolina on October 25, 1956. Capital investments totaling approximately $2 million made possible the construction of the main buildings on the 200-acre site donated by the M.C. Braswell heirs of Rocky Mount, and four years later 92 students enrolled in the first class at North Carolina Wesleyan College. In 1964, 33 students received their degrees at the college's first Commencement. Nearly 9,000 students have earned bachelor's degrees in the arts and sciences and selected professional disciplines since its founding.

In 2015, the college added its first two master's programs. Seven years later, the college changed its name to "university" in 2022.

Campus 

The  Rocky Mount campus includes six residence halls, nine academic and administrative buildings, the Everett Gymnasium, The Dunn Center, and outdoor athletic facilities, including a soccer field, baseball field, tennis courts, Indoor Sports & Education Facility, artificial turf field, intramural fields, and softball field. There is also an on-campus Starbucks attached to the Pearsall Library. In addition to a residential campus, Wesleyan has developed a strong multi-campus Adult & Professional degree program with locations in Brunswick, Durham, Goldsboro, Greenville, Manteo, New Bern, Raleigh, Washington, Wilmington and Winston-Salem in addition to the main campus in Rocky Mount.

Academics 
The university offers 33 undergraduate programs, 33 minor programs and two graduate degrees. It is a member of the National Association of Schools and Colleges of The United Methodist Church, the North Carolina Independent Colleges and Universities, the National Association of Independent Colleges and Universities, the Council of Independent Colleges, the Association of American Colleges and Universities, the Association of Governing Boards of Universities and Colleges, the National Association of Colleges and Universities Business Officers, and the American Council on Education. Women graduates are eligible for membership in the American Association of University Women. With a 13-1 student-to-faculty ratio, students are more than a number at NCWU and get one-on-one personal attention to help them succeed in the classroom. 

 Top Majors:
 Accounting
 Business Administration
 Computer Information Systems
 Criminal Justice
 Exercise Science
 Leadership
 Psychology

The Roger G. and Gaile Davenport Taylor Honors Program 

North Carolina Wesleyan University offers a select group of students the opportunity to complement their degree program with a series of challenging and rewarding courses. Freshmen take special courses in composition and humanities. Honors Program students then take one honors course each semester during their sophomore and junior years. As seniors, students complete an Honors Project in some area of interest. The Honors Program offers students the opportunity to develop a close community of learning and to take courses from some of the best faculty members at the university. Being in the Honors Program does not add to a student's course load, but it does add variety and depth to her or his higher education experience. Transcripts of Honors graduates include recognition that they completed the Honors Program.

Student life 

As of 2022, about 1,833 students are enrolled in the traditional program on campus, up 75% since 2014. Another 1,200 students are enrolled in adult studies programs on campus and at satellite locations. Wesleyan has a growing international student population from 40+ countries. The university community welcomes and includes people from diverse religious, cultural, and racial backgrounds.All students receive free parking on campus, admission to regular season athletic games and access to the student health center. In addition, books are included in tuition and there is no application fee. There are more than 30 Student Clubs & Organizations on campus.

Honor societies
 Alpha Phi Alpha - the first Black, Inter-Collegiate Greek-Lettered fraternity.
 Alpha Sigma Phi - the tenth oldest fraternity in the United States.
 Delta Phi Epsilon - a National Panhellenic Conference affiliated social sorority.
 Nu Gamma Phi - a affiliated non social fraternity.
 Omicron Delta Kappa - national honorary leadership fraternity.
 Phi Eta Sigma - National collegiate scholastic honor society for freshman.
 Pi Gamma Mu - International Honor Society for Social Sciences.
 Psi Chi - National Honor Society for Psychology.
 Sigma Tau Delta - International English Honors Society
 Kappa Mu Epsilon - National Mathematics Honor Society

Publications
 The Decree (student-developed newspaper)
 WESmagazine (bi-annual magazine)

Athletic Affiliations 
North Carolina Wesleyan is a member of NCAA Division III and the USA South Athletic Conference. They are known as the Battling Bishops with 16 Division III sports teams:

Athletics 
Men's
 Baseball
 Basketball
 Football
 Soccer
 Tennis
 Golf
 Cross Country
 Track & Field

Women's
 Soccer
 Basketball
 Softball
 Volleyball
 Lacrosse
 Tennis
 Cross Country
 Track & Field

6 USA South Athletic Conference Championships in 2020-21

119 Total Championships

13 Consecutive USA South Athletic Conference Men's Tennis Championships

History 
The men's baseball program has two Division III National Championships in 1989 and again in 1999.

The university's football program was established in 2005 with its home stadium at its Rocky Mount campus. The NCWU football team finished the 2007 regular season with an 8–2 mark, its best overall record in the program's short history.  The Battling Bishops made it to the NCAA Division III Football tournament as the USA South champion, where they upset top-seed Washington & Jefferson in the first round 35–34.  Not only was this Wesleyan's first post-season victory, but the first time the top seed lost to a number 8 seed since 1975.

References

External links 
 Official website
 Official athletics website

 
Private universities and colleges in North Carolina
Educational institutions established in 1956
Universities and colleges accredited by the Southern Association of Colleges and Schools
Art museums and galleries in North Carolina
Education in Nash County, North Carolina
Buildings and structures in Nash County, North Carolina
Tourist attractions in Nash County, North Carolina
Education in Wayne County, North Carolina
1956 establishments in North Carolina